Willis Towers Watson Public Limited Company is a British-American multinational company providing insurance services. The company was founded in 2016, following a merger of the Willis Group and Towers Watson.

Overview 
WTW operates in more than 140 countries and has a workforce of more than 40,000 employees. It  joined the Hedge Fund Standards Board and follows the voluntary code of standards of best practice endorsed by its members.

History 
The former Willis Towers Watson formed as a merger of equals between London based Willis Group and Arlington based Towers Watson. Towers Watson was formed as a merger between Towers Perrin and Watson Wyatt in 2009.

WTW changed its Nasdaq stock ticker symbol from "WLTW" to "WTW" effective January 10, 2022.

Merger process 
The companies announced the merger on June 30, 2015 in a deal valued at $18 billion. Willis Towers Watson would maintain its domicile in Ireland and list on the New York Stock Exchange. Later in 2015, the company moved its domicile to Virginia in the US and delisted from the NYSE and relisted on the NASDAQ. Willis Group exercised its right to acquire the remainder of Gras Savoye and agreed to purchase 85% of Miller, the leading London independent wholesale insurance broker.

Criticism 
Critics of the deal pointed out that the original offer would not be beneficial to Towers Watson shareholders as they would receive a package of shares and a special cash dividend that is valued at $125.13 per share. This value was 9.3% lower than the trading price of Towers Watson's stock was at the time of the announcement of the deal. The revised offer in November increased the value to $130.26 per share, which was still lower than the trading price of Towers Watson shares at the time of the announcement.  The deal also gave Willis Group shareholders more control despite the company having a lower market capitalization compared to Towers Watson.

In an open letter, investment adviser Driehaus Capital Management urged Towers Watson shareholders to vote against a proposed merger. Driehaus argued that Towers Watson was worth between 39% and 53% more as a standalone company than by merging with Willis Group. It was also reported that Towers Watson CEO John Haley had disposed of his shares in the company in early March 2015 while the merger negotiations were ongoing.

On 18 November 2015, the board of Towers Watson failed to get enough investor support for the deal, with only 40% of shareholders voting in favor of the proposed merger with Willis Group. This rejection led to Willis Group increasing its special cash dividend for Towers Watson shareholders to USD $10 per share. This revised offer was approved by Towers Watson shareholders on 11 December 2015.

Completion of merger 
The merger closed on January 5, 2016 once all regulatory approvals were received. Willis Towers Watson publicly announced their name change on January 5. Willis Group shareholders owned 50.1% while those of Towers Watson shareholders owned 49.9% of the combined company.

On completion, Towers Watson CEO, John Haley, became the CEO, Willis Group CEO, Dominic Casserley, became the President and Deputy CEO while Willis Group Chair, James McCann, became the chair of the merged group with the twelve board seats shared equally between the two companies.

Called off acquisition by Aon 
On 9 March 2020, Aon announced its planned acquisition of Willis Towers Watson for nearly $30 billion in an all-stock deal that would have created the world’s largest insurance broker. The deal was called off on 26 July 2021 after failing to reach agreement with the US Department of Justice.

Carl Hess becomes CEO 
In August 2021, Carl Hess was selected as the company’s president and next CEO to succeed on January 1, 2022 upon John Haley’s retirement. A new global leadership team was also announced in August 2021. In January 2022, Carl Hess formally succeeded John Haley as CEO and Willis Towers Watson became WTW.

Activist stakes
Investors Starboard Value and Elliott Management were reported to have taken substantial stakes in the company in 2021.

Acquisition of Butterwire 
In July 2022, Willis Towers Watson acquired Butterwire, a FinTech provider of data analytics, artificial intelligence (AI) and machine learning platforms.

References

External links 
 WTW

Financial services companies established in 2016
British companies established in 2016
Companies listed on the Nasdaq
Financial services companies based in the City of London
Tax inversions
Risk management companies